Aleksandar Stanković (born 17 February 1998) is a Serbian football goalkeeper who plays for OFK Beograd, on loan from Grafičar Beograd.

External links
 
 

1998 births
Living people
Association football goalkeepers
Serbian footballers
Serbia under-21 international footballers
RFK Grafičar Beograd players
FK Napredak Kruševac players
HŠK Zrinjski Mostar players
OFK Beograd players
Serbian SuperLiga players
Serbian First League players
Serbian expatriate footballers
Expatriate footballers in Bosnia and Herzegovina
Serbian expatriate sportspeople in Bosnia and Herzegovina